Shahrabad (also Romanized as Shahrābād) is a village in Mehr Rural District, Bashtin District, Davarzan County, Razavi Khorasan Province, Iran. At the 2006 census, its population was 248, in 70 families.

References 

Populated places in Davarzan County